"The Nameless" is a song by American heavy metal band Slipknot. The song was released as the only single from their first live album, 9.0: Live, while it is also included on their third studio album, Vol. 3: (The Subliminal Verses). A music video was released for the single in late 2005 and also was featured on MTV's Rock Top 10 as number two.

Musical structure
The Nameless is four minutes and 28 seconds long. The song begins with a high-noted guitar riff, with mixed in samples, leading to the guitar notes getting lower, and lead vocalist Corey Taylor starting the lyrics with a scream. This eventually leads to low noted riffs with minor scales associated in. The song has a "basic minor-key riff," along with "thrash" riffs, and interludes that are much softer. The chorus is slow, emotional and epic. The song is in B minor, like many other Slipknot songs.

Music video

The accompanying music video was directed by band member Shawn Crahan, who has also created and assisted with several of Slipknot's other videos. The video was featured on their video album Voliminal: Inside the Nine.

The music video depicts Slipknot performing live on their second headline tour The Subliminal Verses World Tour. The videos features various clips and shots of their fans during the concert. The video was directed by the band's co-founder and custom percussionist Shawn 'Clown' Crahan, and was featured on Voliminal: Inside the Nine, the band's third video album that received a platinum in the US. Many of the photos featured in 9.0: Live are seen in the video. At the end of the video, a caption says "Dedicated to all the Maggots [Slipknot fans] everywhere".

As of March 2023, the music video for "The Nameless" has over 14 million views on YouTube.

Promotion of 9.0: Live
Before the 9.0: Live'''s release, a sample from the live recording of "The Nameless" was made available on the Internet through the band's record label. A music video featuring the live recording of "The Nameless" was created to promote the album.

Critical receptionBlender commented that "Relief from 'Prelude [3.0]' arrives quickly in the basic minor-key riffs and grooves of... 'The Nameless'..." Dan Silver from NME said "'The Nameless' intercuts thrash riffs with softly-strummed interludes". Robert Cherry of Rolling Stone said it "splices a cooing boy-band chorus onto a g-g-gunky speed metal verse". Yahoo!s Chris Heath said the song "confusingly stitches both extremes together – the ludicrously vicious and ridiculously placid – into one track that simply feels awkward, wrong even".

Appearances on other albums
"The Nameless" was featured in the album Promo only: Modern Rock Radio in 2005. The album is by various artists including System of a Down, OK Go, Fall Out Boy, and several others.
It was also track number eight on Radioactive: Mainstream & Rock series in December 2005. The album features various artists that include many of the artists featured on Promo only: Modern Rock Radio.
The song also appeared on The Scorched Earth Orchestra Performs Slipknot, an album produced by Noah Agruss and released on August 12, 2008. With nine other tracks, the tribute album released by Vitamin Records and includes covers of tracks from Slipknot's first three studio albums. The label's website enthuse that The Scorched Earth Orchestra'' "expand on Slipknot's marching-band-from-hell framework" with "booming percussion, in-your-face horns [and] string sections that rip at your flesh".

Track listing

Chart positions

References

2004 songs
Slipknot (band) songs
2005 singles
Songs written by Corey Taylor
Songs written by Jim Root
Songs written by Paul Gray (American musician)
Songs written by Joey Jordison
Roadrunner Records singles